Pseudepierus is a genus of clown beetles in the family Histeridae. There are at least two described species in Pseudepierus.

Species
These two species belong to the genus Pseudepierus:
 Pseudepierus gentilis (Horn, 1883)
 Pseudepierus italicus (Paykull, 1811)

References

Further reading

 
 

Histeridae
Articles created by Qbugbot